The 2010 ICF Canoe Sprint World Championships were held 19–22 August 2010 in Poznań, Poland, on Lake Malta. This was the third time that the Polish city hosted the championships, having done so previously in 1990 and 2001. Paracanoe (formerly paddleability) and the women's C-1 200 m events that were exhibition events at the previous world championships in Dartmouth, Nova Scotia, Canada, became official events at these championships.

Germany and Hungary won the most medals at the championships with twelve each though the Hungarians won six golds, the most of the championships, compared to the Germans' five golds. Brazil, Japan and Tahiti won their first ever championship medals. Ronald Rauhe of Germany became the winningest medalist in men's kayak with his 21st career medal, earning that in a K-1 200 m silver. Rauhe eclipsed that record he had tied at the previous championships with fellow German Torsten Gutsche. In women's kayak, Hungary's Katalin Kovács tied Germany's Birgit Fischer for most career medals with 38 with three medals earned though Kovács 29th gold passed Fischer's 28 career golds. For the first time since 1975, a tie occurred in the medals only this time it was for the bronze in the C-1 200 m event between Canada's Richard Dalton and Ukraine's Yuriy Cheban. Canada also won the first gold medal in women's canoe with Laurence Vincent-Lapointe winning gold. Paracanoe's big winners were Brazil and Canada with three medals each.

Explanation of events
Canoe sprint competitions are broken up into Canadian canoe (C), an open canoe with a single-blade paddle, or in kayaks (K), a closed canoe with a double-bladed paddle. Each canoe or kayak can hold one person (1), two people (2), or four people (4). When a competition is listed as a C-2 500 m event as an example, it means two people are in a canoe competing at a  distance.

Preliminaries to the event
Poznań was awarded the 2010 championships at an ICF board of directors meeting in Madrid, Spain, on 23 October 2003.

Event format changes
At the 2009 ICF board of directors meeting in Windsor, Berkshire, England, women's C-1 200 m was added for these championships while women's C-2 500 m will remain a demonstration event like it had the previous championships. The relay events, started at the previous championships, and 5000 m events, included for the first time since their discontinuation after the 1993 championships in Copenhagen, will also occur. Paracanoe (formerly referred to as paddleability) will have four events covering three classifications with LTA (Legs, Trunk, and Arms), TA (Trunk and Arms), and A (Arms only). The events were confirmed following successes at the previous world championships on 18 December 2009. The schedule for the championships was released on 10 June 2010.

Visit from the ICF
During the week of 1 March 2010, the ICF visited Lake Malta to meet with the Host Organizing Committee (HOC) to see how event preparations were progressing. Some items discussed were broadcasting, event promotion, athlete services, and communications. 2.5 hours of live television coverage on a daily basis is planned for the semifinal and final event as provided in the contract to meet the needs of the European market. 61 million people watched last year's championships in Canada. ICF Secretary General Simon Toulson expressed his support of the HOC and his hope that the 2010 championships will be a good one.

Event progress
After opening ceremonies on the 18th, the first round of events took place on the 19th with 1000 m events completing their heats and the semifinals. Paracanoe heats were suspended later that day to high winds and weather conditions.

Participating nations
75 nations were listed on the preliminary entry list. The numbers in parentheses shown are for those who competed for each respective nation.

Russia had the most overall attendees with 42.

The media guide listed 75 nations as participating, but four nations listed did not compete (India, Iraq, Malta, Malaysia).

Results

Men's
 Non-Olympic classes

Canoe
Russia won the most medals with four. The people with the most medals were two with Ivan Shtyl (Russia), Alexandru Dumitrescu (Romania), Victo Mihalachi (Romania), Vadim Menkov (Uzbeskistan), Dzianis Harasha (Belarus), Ronald Verch (Germany), and Paweł Baraszkiewicz (Poland). For the second time in the history of the championships, a tie occurred for a medal in the C-1 200 m bronze between Canada's Richard Dalton and Ukraine's Yuriy Cheban. The first occurred thirty-five years earlier, in the K-1 1000 m gold between Italy's Oreste Perri and Poland's Grzegorz Śledziewski.

Kayak
Germany and Great Britain were the big medal winners with four each. Germany won the most golds with two. Ronald Rauhe won his record twenty-first world championship medal, eclipsing the record he tied last year with fellow German Torsten Gutsche. Ten canoeists each won two medals from five different countries.

Women's
 Non-Olympic classes

Canoe
The first women's event was won by Canada's Laurence Vincent-Lapointe.

Kayak
Hungary was the big medal winner, medaling in all nine events including six golds. The big individual winner was Natasa Janics of Hungary with five (three gold, two silver). Her teammate Katalin Kovács, won three medals to bring her career total to 38, matching that of Germany's Birgit Fischer though Kovacs did break Fischer's career gold medal count to 29, eclipsing Fischer's 28. Japan earned their first medal at the championships with Shinobu Kitamoto's bronze in the K-1 200 m event. Rachel Cawthorn became the first British woman to medal at the championships with her bronze in the K-1 500 m event.

Paracanoe
Italy won the most medals with four though none of them were gold. Canada and Brazil each won two golds and three overall. All three of Brazil's medals were the first in the history of the world championships. Tahiti's Patrick Viriamu became the first medalist from his country at the world championships as well.

Exhibition

Women's canoe

Medal table 
Shown for the non-exhibition events only.

Source: Medal table – from official website. Retrieved 22 August 2010.

References

External links
International Canoe Federation provisional calendar for 2009–11, including the 2010 championships. – Retrieved 8 August 2008.
Official website & 

Icf Canoe Sprint World Championships
Canoeing Sprint World Championships
ICF Canoe Sprint World Championships
Canoeing
Sport in Poznań
21st century in Poznań
Canoeing and kayaking competitions in Poland